The farm gate value of a cultivated product in agriculture and aquaculture 
 is the market value of a product minus the selling costs (transport costs, marketing costs).

The market value is not the same as the price farmers get for their product, as (if an auction is used), the value they get per weight may be well below the market price. In some cases, the value they get per weight may even be below the breakeven price.

When selling by auction, the price the farmers get for their product is typically lower than the price they get if they sell directly to the consumer (as they are able to set this price themselves).

The farm gate value is also far lower than the retail price consumers pay in a store as it does not include the additional costs the store makes (shipping, handling, storage, marketing) nor the profit margin the involved companies ask.

References 

Definition according to the OECD Glossary of Statistical Terms

Agricultural economics